EuroFIR (European Food Information Resource) is a non-profit international association, which supports use of existing food composition data and future resources through cooperation and harmonization of data quality, functionality and global standards.

The purpose of the association is the development, management, publication and exploitation of food composition data, and the promotion of international cooperation and harmonization through improved data quality, food composition database searchability and standards, for example, with the European Committee for Standardization on the standard for food data. Other work includes that on ethnic  and traditional foods  and critical evaluation of data on nutrients

Membership

Full members
(*) Member organisations, which are also national food composition database compilers.

Associate members
(*) Member organisations, which are also national food composition database compilers.

Ordinary members

Honoured members

List of EuroFIR AISBL key people, members and collaborators on the EuroFIR website.

References

External links
  of EuroFIR/European Food Information Resource
 INFOODS – International Network of Food Data Systems
 Codex Alimentarius – Set up by the Food and Agriculture Organization of the United Nations and the World Health Organization to develop food standards, guidelines and related texts such as codes of practice under their Joint Food Standards Programme.
 LanguaL – The International Framework for Food Description
 EFSA – European Food Safety Authority
 CEN – European Committee for Standardization

Food- and drink-related organizations
Food technology organizations
Health education organizations
Malnutrition organizations
Non-profit organisations based in Belgium